William Ord may refer to:
 William Ord (1781–1855), English politician and landowner, MP for Morpeth, and for Newcastle-upon-Tyne 
 William Ord of Fenham (c. 1715–1768), English land and mine owner, MP for Bossiney
 William Miller Ord (1834–1902), British medical scientist